František Čermák and Filip Polášek were the defending champions, but decided not to participate together.
Čermak played alongside Michal Mertiňák, but lost in the first round to Marcos Baghdatis and Eric Butorac, while Polášek teamed up with Julian Knowle and lost in the semifinals to Jarkko Nieminen and Dmitry Tursunov.
Nieminen and Tursunov went on to win the title, defeating Baghdatis and Butorac in the final, 6–1, 6–4.

Seeds

Draw

Draw

References
 Main Draw

BMW Openandnbsp;- Doubles
2013 BMW Open